Ab Bakhsh is a village in Badghis Province in north-western Afghanistan. It is located in Qadis District.

References

External links
Satellite map at Maplandia.com

Populated places in Badghis Province
Villages in Afghanistan